Claudio Miranda,  is a Chilean cinematographer. He is best known for his work on Ang Lee's film Life of Pi, for which he won the Academy Award for Best Cinematography, and for David Fincher's film The Curious Case of Benjamin Button, which was the first film shot entirely digitally to be nominated for the Academy Award for Best Cinematography and the American Society of Cinematographers Award. He is also known for his collaborations with American director Joseph Kosinski. He is the second Chilean person to win an Academy Award.

Career
Miranda first worked with David Fincher in 1995 as the gaffer on Seven. He performed the same role on The Game and Fight Club before becoming an additional photographer on Zodiac. He carried on Fincher's previous use of the Thomson Viper FilmStream Camera on Zodiac when filming The Curious Case of Benjamin Button. Recently, he has become known for his collaborations with American director Joseph Kosinski, acting as cinematographer in all of his movies.

Personal life
Miranda was born in Santiago to a Chilean father and a Danish mother. When he was a year old, he and his family emigrated to the United States.

Filmography

Additional photography

Awards and nominations

References

External links

Living people
American cinematographers
Best Cinematographer Academy Award winners
Best Cinematography BAFTA Award winners
Chilean emigrants to the United States
Chilean people of Danish descent
1964 births